The 2018–19 Côte d'Ivoire Ligue 1 is the 60th season of the Côte d'Ivoire Ligue 1, the top-tier football league in the Ivory Coast (Côte d'Ivoire), since its establishment in 1960. The season started on 7 September 2018.

League table

References

Ligue 1 (Ivory Coast) seasons
Ivory Coast
1